Vitali Nikolayevich Kakunin (born 9 May 1979) is a retired Russian professional football player.

Honours
 Russian First Division top scorer: 2001 (20 goals).

External links
 

1979 births
People from North Kazakhstan Region
Living people
Russian footballers
Association football forwards
FC Torpedo Miass players
FC Rubin Kazan players
FC Mordovia Saransk players
FC Neftekhimik Nizhnekamsk players
FC Novokuznetsk players